Empresses in the Palace (lit. The Legend of Zhen Huan) is a 2011 Chinese television series based on the novel of the same name by Liu Lianzi. Directed by Zheng Xiaolong, it stars Sun Li in the title role of Zhen Huan. The series started airing in China for the first time on 17 November 2011.

Premise
In 1722, after the death of Kangxi Emperor, then Prince Yinzhen and his eight brothers were embroiled in a bitter power struggle for the Qing dynasty throne. With the help of powerful allies, Prince Yinzhen becomes Yongzheng Emperor and the brothers who fought against him were either killed or exiled. Despite becoming Emperor, he grows increasingly paranoid of being usurpsed and vowed to not follow his father's footstep of letting his consorts be unfaithful or have affairs.

Prior to the struggle, he was deeply in love with his first wife, Empress Chunyuan. The Empress tragically passed and the position went to her younger sister Empress Yixiu. Both Empresses and Yongzheng Emperor's mother, the  Empress Dowager come from the Ula-Nara clan.

Plot 

Six months after ascending the throne, the Empress Dowager organizes a selection to bring newer members into the Imperial Harem. Despite not wanting to be selected, the titular Zhenhuan, then known as Lady Huan Zhen, forced to join the selection and ends up being chosen due to her resemblance to Empress Chunyuan. She joins the Imperial Harem alongside her childhood best friend Meizhuang Shen, and low-born lady Lingrong An.

Huan attempted to avoid the Imperial Harem's politics but ultimately falls in love with Yongzheng Emperor at first, causing various schemes to be plotted against her and Meizhuang in retaliation. Pressured by her family to elevate themselves and out of jealousy towards Huan's position, Lingrong also begins plotting against the former and worked alongside higher-ranking members, notably with Empress Yixiu to do so. Despite the scheming and evidence against them, the Empress is never punished due to her status and Empress Dowager's attempts at protecting Empress Yixiu due to the desire to keep the Ula-Nara clan's influence in the Imperial Court. Huan also learns of why the Emperor actually favors her, which also fueled the same plots against her, and she becomes disillusioned of the realities of Imperial Harem life despite being favored.

Possessive over his women, Yongzheng Emperor becomes suspicious of her loyalty as she becomes closer to his younger half-brother Prince Guo. While avoiding the pitfalls of schemes against her, she befriends the neglected Prince Hongli, promising to care for him when she is able to. The disillusionment ultimately get to her and Huan asks to become a nun at Ganlu Temple along with Meizhuang. There, her relationship with Prince Guo secretly blossom and the two become intimate with each other.

Despite the two planning to elope, Prince Guo is sent away to Tibet by Yongzheng Emperor's orders and believed to be dead. Out of revenge for his death and to bring her family back from exile, Huan convinces Yongzheng Emperor to take her back into the Imperial Harem. She takes on a new identity as Consort Xi, or Zhenhuan Niohuru, the biological mother of Prince Hongli who had supposedly spent years away from the Imperial Court praying at the Ganlu Temple but now returned to serve the Emperor once more, and she formally adopts Prince Hongli as she promised. With her new status, Zhenhuan gains more allies and the Imperial Harem is divided into two camps: those that support her and those that support Empress Yixiu. The Empress begins to lose favor as her schemes against Zhenhuan backfire and she ultimately confesses to her role in her sister's death and several other crimes as a means of securing the position of Empress Dowager by all means. Yongzheng Emperor attempts to strip her titles as punishment but the Empress Dowager's will forbids him from doing so. Yongzheng Emperor unwillingly promises to uphold the will's command out of love for Empress Chunyuan and Empress Yixiu is put under house arrest instead.

Prince Guo is revealed to be alive and the two attempt to cease their relationship now that Zhenhuan has returned to the Imperial Harem. Despite doing what she can to remain favored by Yongzheng Emperor and distance herself from Prince Guo, the Emperor's suspicion towards the relationship escalates as time passes and he believes Prince Guo plans to usurp the throne through her. Zhenhuan is ordered to kill Prince Guo but the latter commits suicide instead, causing Yongzheng Emperor to reward her obedience by promoting her to be the de facto Empress of the Imperial Harem in all but name. The Emperor is slowly poisoned as he ages and Zhenhuan meets with him one final time before announcing his death. Yongzheng Emperor's final will names Prince Hongli as his successor and the prince becomes the newly crowned Qianlong Emperor. Zhenhuan is granted the coveted title of Empress Dowager, giving her status above all women within the Imperial Court and becoming her son's closest advisor.

Zhenhuan visits Empress Yixiu, still under house arrest, one last time to let her know of the coronation. Although Empress Yixiu should have been given the title of Empress Dowager upon Yongzheng Emperor's death, a loophole in the previous Empress Dowager's command forces Empress Yixiu to remain Empress indefinitely instead. Before leaving, Zhenhuan thanks Empress Yixiu for all the hard lessons she endured as a result of the latter's scheming and harm. Empress Yixiu is left to realize all her efforts to be Empress Dowager had been for nothing and later dies out of madness.

Zhenhuan spends the rest of her life serving as the Empress Dowager: planning the next Imperial Harem selection, advising Qianlong Emperor on royal matters, and warning his wives the consequences of scheming or causing harm against each other. Years of surviving in the Imperial Harem has shown to harden Zhenhuan and the series ends with her going to bed after a long day while her dreams replayed memories of her past.

Cast

Main

Supporting

Yongzheng's Harem
Ranking System: Empress 皇后 / Imperial Noble Consort 皇贵妃 / Noble Consort 贵妃 / Consort 妃 / Concubine 嫔 / Noble Lady 贵人 / First Attendant 常在 / Second Attendant 答应 / Chosen Maid 管女子. In the series, it is considered a huge honor to be bestowed a title, rather than using one's surname, for one's rank.

Imperial Family

Imperial Princes and Consorts

Imperial Princesses

Court Officials

Palace Servants 

Imperial Physicians 

Gan Lu Temple

Special Appearance

Soundtrack

Backstage crew 
Publishers: Zheng Xiaolong, Zhong Yi, Dun Yong, Li Ruigang
Producers: Cao Ping, Dun Qi, Xu Xiaoou
Supervisors: Liu Zhiyuan, Wang Xiaodong, Zhang Suzhou, Chen Liang, Tang Rang, Zhang Ping, Li Junming, Zhang Ping, Zhao Hongmei, Chen Yaping
Director: Zheng Xiaolong
Deputy director's assistants: Dong Xiaoyun (Assistant Director), Liu Le (Assistant), Zheng Hanqing (Assistant)
Script writer: Liu Lianzi, Wang Xiaoping
Photographer: Li Zhiqiang, Li Qiang, Yu Fei, Zhang Yuanshou, Feng Yucheng, Wang Lindong, Zhao Hao, He Lichun, Chen Jianwei, Wei Liangliang, Li Meng, Yang Jinbo
Music: Liu Huan, Meng Ke, Ding Ji, Zhao Liang, Song Lei, Wang Songyang, Wan Xiaoyuan, Li Wei, Sui Jing, Asian Philharmonic Orchestra, Huang Lijie
Editor: Jin Ye, Jiang Jimei, cao translation
Props: Wang Yue, Liu Yuanfei, Wang Guiqing, Wang Shili, Gao Guiyong, Liu Jiye, Zhang Yanlong, Fang Jie, LiBiao, Cao Yongli, Wang Yanhua, Su Huizhi, gao Yashi, Gao Xian, Young spring library, Lv Qiang, Zhang Fengjun
Casting director: Li Yang
Voice acting directors: Liao Jing and Zhang Wei
Art designers: Chen Haozhong, Luan Hexin, Wang Yongkang, Yang Kun
Modeling designers: Chen Minzheng, Li Yuanyuan, Wang Yingkai, Kou Hainan, Yang Jia, Sun Yue, Guo Yang, Min Cong, Zhang Rongbin, Qin Yiping, Wen Lulu, Xing Lu
Fashion designers: Chen Tongxun, Shi Dongling, Ji Doni, Zhu Yuxiang, Tang Biyun, Liu Xiaohu, Chen Guanglin, Guo Sheng, Shi Jianmin
Visual effects: Beijing Huacai Shengtang Mathematics Technology Co., LTD
Lighting crew: Li Tianlei, Zhang Xin 'an, Zhang Cun, Wang Zhonghai, Xu Wanfei, Zhang Feng, Lin Shucong, Wu Tianzhao, Zhang Yunling, Meng Xudong, Chen Guofu, Xu Bing, Zhang Jiayu
Recording crew: An Wei, Liu Xinghe, Lin Xin
Directors: Zhang Xiaonan, Zhang Xiaofeng, Wang Gaofeng, Wang Kuanxi, Guan Xiaoming, Wang Kuandong, Zhang Yongbo, Zhang Wei, Dai Zuyin, Dai Zuyuan, Li Shunyi, Li Weitan, Jia Xinquan, Liu Quanmin
Script supervisor: Guo Guanhua, Yu Feng
Issuing: Cheng Ting

Impact

Chinese traditional arts 
According to the Overseas Chinese Language and Culture Education Online website, The Filigree Inlaid Metal Art (花丝镶嵌), an accessory craft skill that could be oriented back to the Spring and Autumn Period from 770 to 256 BC that uses gold, silver, and metal as the based; pearls, and gems on top, attracted a wide number of audience and became a phenomenon due to it being featured on Empresses in the Palace'..''

Ratings 

 Highest ratings are marked in red, lowest ratings are marked in blue.

Accolades

International broadcast
The drama was first aired in China in 2011 on Shaoxing News, a regional channel. As it gained popularity there it was picked up by national TV channels and first aired nationwide in 2012.

In April 2015, the series was added to US region of Netflix and has since been taken off and put on Amazon Prime Video. It was edited down to six episodes, each with a ninety-minute duration. The original audio was kept intact with the addition of closed captions in English.

In Thailand, the series was first aired in 2016 on Channel 7 and in 2018 on One31 and LINE TV.

The series was uploaded on YouTube by LeTV in 2018.

References 

2011 Chinese television series debuts
Chinese historical television series
Television shows based on Chinese novels
Television series by SMG Pictures
Television series set in the Qing dynasty